Oldřich Zábrodský (February 28, 1926 – September 22, 2015) was an ice hockey player for the Czechoslovak national team. He won a silver medal at the 1948 Winter Olympics. He was born in Prague, Czechoslovakia.

He played for LTC Praha. After the Spengler Cup in late 1948, he didn't return to Czechoslovakia and stayed in Switzerland, where he finished the season playing for HC Davos. The next two seasons Zábrodský played for HC Lausanne before ending his professional career. In 1951 he emigrated to the United States through Italy. In 1960 he moved to Belgium, where he lived until his death in 2015.

His mother was Russian, and his brother Vladimír was also a hockey player.

References 

1926 births
2015 deaths
Czech people of Russian descent
Czechoslovak defectors
Czechoslovak emigrants to the United States
Czechoslovak emigrants to Belgium
HC Davos players
Ice hockey players at the 1948 Winter Olympics
Medalists at the 1948 Winter Olympics
Olympic ice hockey players of Czechoslovakia
Olympic medalists in ice hockey
Olympic silver medalists for Czechoslovakia
Ice hockey people from Prague
Czechoslovak emigrants to Switzerland
Czechoslovak expatriate sportspeople in Switzerland
Czech ice hockey defencemen
Czechoslovak ice hockey defencemen